is a Japanese seafood company, beginning its operation in 1880, when its founder, Ikujiro Nakabe, began a fish sale business in Osaka. The company is the largest of its kind in Japan, with Nippon Suisan Kaisha and Kyokuyo Co., Ltd. as its main competitors.

Group Slogan is "Bringing Delicious Delight to the World."

Maruha Nichiro has subsidiaries in Japan, New Zealand, Australia, the United States, across Europe, Asia and South America.

It is listed on the Tokyo Stock Exchange and is a constituent of the Nikkei 225 stock index.

History
 1880 - The founder, Ikujiro Nakabe, begins purchasing fish from fishermen for sale to wholesalers at the wholesale fish market in Osaka
 1904 - Operation base moved to Shimonoseki in Yamaguchi Prefecture
 1924 - Incorporated as K.K. Hayashikane Shoten, ending the era of private operation
 1943 - Corporate name changed to Nishi Taiyo Gyogyo Tosei K.K. 
 1945 - Corporate name changed to Taiyo Gyogyo K.K. (Taiyo Fishery Co., Ltd.) (virtually all overseas assets and operations lost at the end of World War II)
 1949 - Corporate headquarters moved to Tokyo
Taiyo professional baseball club (present-day Yokohama DeNA BayStars) established
 1951 - Overseas operations started
 1960 - Operations expanded from the marine products business into feeds and livestock production
 1978 - New headquarters building completed in central Tokyo
 1993 - New trademark adopted and corporate name changed to Maruha Corporation (Maruha Kabushiki Kaisha)
 1996 - Acquisition of Taiyo Seafoods Co., Ltd. 
 2004 - Maruha Group Inc. established as a holding company
 2007 - Economic union of Maruha Group Inc. and Nichiro Corporation merged into Maruha Nichiro Holdings, Inc.
 2011 - Sold Yokohama BayStars to DeNA.
 2014 - Reorganization of the company structure and adoption of the Maruha Nichiro Corporation name and listing of the company's stock on the Tokyo Stock Exchange.

See also

 Fishing industry in Japan

References

External links
  

Companies listed on the Tokyo Stock Exchange
Food and drink companies based in Tokyo
Food and drink companies established in 1880
Japanese companies established in 1880